Bruce Wannell (d. 29 January 2020) was a polyglot, translator, linguist, and traveller. His expertise was on the Persianate regions - particularly Iran and Afghanistan. He occasionally lectured at the School of Oriental and African Studies, University of London, particularly on Persian Poetry

Bruce Wannell read Modern Languages at Oriel College, Oxford

His obituary  was published in the London Times

A book about his life  was published in 2020 by Sickle Moon Press: Rogerson, Barnaby, and Rose Baring,  editors. Tales from the Life of Bruce Wannell: Adventurer, Linguist, Orientalist''.  ISBN 9781900209250

References 

2020 deaths
Linguists from the United Kingdom
Alumni of Oriel College, Oxford